The Rallye International du Valais is a yearly rally in the canton of Valais in Switzerland. It was founded by Philippe Simonetta, a local wine dealer in 1960. Since 1980 it has been part of the European Rally Championship and in 2007 and 2008 it was an event of the Intercontinental Rally Challenge. In 2009, it became a top category (coeff. 20) event of the European Rally Championship and since then it has been the final event of the ERC season. The rally headquarters is in Martigny.

Recent winners

External links 
 www.riv.ch – Official web site

Rally competitions in Switzerland
Valais
Valais